Grant Richard Kwiecinski, also known by his stage name GRiZ, is an American DJ, songwriter, and electronic producer from Southfield Michigan. He is known for playing the saxophone along with producing funk, electro-soul, and self-described future-funk.

Albums

Studio albums

Mixtapes

Extended plays

Singles

As lead artist

As featured artist

Other charted songs

Guest appearances

Production credits

Remixes

Notes

References

Discographies of American artists
Electronic music discographies
Funk music discographies